This is a list of flag bearers who have represented Sudan at the Olympics.

Flag bearers carry the national flag of their country at the opening ceremony of the Olympic Games.

See also
Sudan at the Olympics

References

Sudan at the Olympics
Sudan
Olympic flagbearers
Olympic flagbearers